Joshua Allen, 2nd Viscount Allen, LLD (17 September 1685 – 5 December 1742), was an Irish peer and politician.

He was the son of The 1st Viscount Allen, and succeeded to his father's titles on 8 November 1726. Between 1709 and 1727, he represented Kildare County in the Irish House of Commons.

Family
The future Lord Allen married Margaret du Pass on 18 November 1707. They had seven children, of whom at least three died young. They included:

John Allen, 3rd Viscount Allen (b. bef. 1708 – 25 May 1745)
Elizabeth, married 1750 John Proby, 1st Baron Carysfort
Frances, married 1758 William Mayne, 1st Baron Newhaven.

References

1685 births
1742 deaths
Irish MPs 1703–1713
Irish MPs 1713–1714
Irish MPs 1715–1727
Members of the Parliament of Ireland (pre-1801) for County Kildare constituencies
Members of the Privy Council of Ireland
Members of the Irish House of Lords
Joshua 2